Bucher, or Bücher, is a surname, and may refer to:

 Alf Bucher (1874–1939), Scottish international rugby player
 André Bucher (born 1976), Swiss athlete
 Ewald Bucher (1914–1991), German politician
 John Conrad Bucher (1792–1851), US politician
 John N. Bucher (1871–1932), shopkeeper killed in a robbery by associates of Clyde Barrow
 Josef Bucher, Austrian politician
 Lloyd M. Bucher (1927–2004), commander of the USS Pueblo captured by North Korea
 Lothar Bucher (1817–1892), German publicist
 Marie Kachel Bucher - Seventh Day Baptist
 Ric Bucher (born 1961?), NBA reporter for ESPN
 Roy Bucher  (1895–1980), British general and commander-in-chief of the Indian Army 
 Stefan G. Bucher (born 1973), American writer, graphic designer and illustrator.
 Urs Bucher (born 1953), Swiss wheelchair curler, participant of 2006 Winter Paralympics
 Walter Hermann Bucher (1888–1965), German-American geologist and paleontologist
 Walter Bucher (cyclist) (born 1926), Swiss cyclist

See also 

 Karl Bücher (1847-1930), German economist
 Buker, surname

German toponymic surnames